The Rome Prize is awarded by the American Academy in Rome, in Rome, Italy. Approximately thirty scholars and artists are selected each year to receive a study fellowship at the academy. Prizes have been awarded annually since 1921, with a hiatus during the World War II years, from 1942 to 1949.

Recipients 
Fellows and residents, listed by year of residency:

See also

 List of European art awards
 List of history awards

References

American awards
Architecture awards
American music awards
History awards
Education in Rome
Culture in Rome
Awards established in 1896